The Tour de Capigliolo is a ruined Genoese tower  located in the commune of Casaglione (Corse-du-Sud) on the west coast of the French island of Corsica.

The construction of the tower was begun in 1582. It was one of a series of coastal defences constructed by the Republic of Genoa between 1530 and 1620 to stem the attacks by Barbary pirates. In 2007 the tower was added to the General Inventory of Cultural Heritage (Inventaire général du patrimoine culturel) maintained by the French Ministry of Culture. The tower is privately owned.

See also
List of Genoese towers in Corsica

References

External links
 Includes information on how to reach 90 towers and many photographs.

Towers in Corsica